Aliabad-e Olya (also Romanized as ‘Alīābād-e ‘Olyā; also known as ‘Alīābād, ‘Alīābād-e Bālā, and ‘Alīābād-e Kāmfīrūz-e ‘Olyā) is a village in Kamfiruz-e Jonubi Rural District, Kamfiruz District, Marvdasht County, Fars Province, Iran. At the 2006 census, its population was 1,556, in 344 families.

References 

Populated places in Marvdasht County